Dorthia M. "Dottie" Downs (December 10, 1917 – February 11, 1968) was an  All-American Girls Professional Baseball League player.

Downs was born in South Bend, Indiana, to Ershel and Hilda Downs. Downs joined her home club South Bend Blue Sox in its 1945 season. She appeared in three games and went hitless in five at bats. Additional information is incomplete because there are no records available at the time of the request.

Downs died at age 50, unmarried.

In 1988, 20 years after her death, she was honored with a permanent display at the Baseball Hall of Fame and Museum at Cooperstown, New York. The display honors those who were part of the All-American Girls Professional Baseball League. Dorthia Downs, along with the rest of the girls and the league staff, is included at the display/exhibit.

Sources

External links

1917 births
1968 deaths
All-American Girls Professional Baseball League players
South Bend Blue Sox players
Baseball players from South Bend, Indiana
20th-century American women
20th-century American people